Jack Wang is a Canadian writer from Vancouver, British Columbia, who won the Danuta Gleed Literary Award in 2021 for his debut short story collection We Two Alone.

An associate professor of creative writing at Ithaca College in Ithaca, New York, he has also published several children's books jointly authored with his twin brother Holman Wang.

References

21st-century Canadian short story writers
21st-century Canadian novelists
21st-century Canadian male writers
Canadian male short story writers
Canadian male novelists
Canadian children's writers
Canadian writers of Asian descent
Canadian people of Chinese descent
Canadian expatriate writers in the United States
Ithaca College faculty
Writers from Vancouver
Living people
Year of birth missing (living people)